The discography of Zucchero, an Italian rock blues singer-songwriter, consists of 15 studio albums, one soundtrack album, seven compilation albums, two live albums and more than sixty singles. In 1993, Zucchero has also released a studio album with the band Adelmo e i suoi Sorapis, also including Equipe 84's Maurizio Vandelli and Pooh's Dodi Battaglia.

Zucchero's first two studio albums didn't reach commercial success and failed to chart in Italy, while 1986's Rispetto entered the Top 10 in his home country, where it sold more than 300,000 copies. Its follow-up, titled Blue's, became the best-selling album in Italy of 1987, while 1989's Oro Incenso & Birra was certified eight-times platinum in Italy. For the latter as of 2015 are reported sales of over 8 million copies worldwide.

In 1991, Zucchero released his self-titled compilation, featuring the English-language version of some of his biggest hits, including the single "Senza una donna (Without a Woman)", a duet with Paul Young which charted in the Top 5 in the United Kingdom and United States and topped the European Hot 100. The album Spirito DiVino, released in 1995, has sold more than 2,500,000 copies worldwide and was certified Platinum by the International Federation of the Phonographic Industry for European sales exceeding 1,000,000 units. The following studio albums were also million selling.

As of 2017, Zucchero has released 10 Italian number-one studio albums, including his last effort Black Cat, and 4 Italian number-one compilation albums, including 1996's The Best of Zucchero Sugar Fornaciari's Greatest Hits, which was certified triple platinum in Europe, and 2004's Zu & Co., which was also certified platinum in Europe.

Zucchero has sold over 50 million records around the world.

Albums

Studio albums

Soundtracks

Compilation albums

Live albums

Side projects

Singles

As lead singer

1982–1990

1991–2000

2001–2010

2011–present

As featured artist

References 

Discographies of Italian artists
Blues discographies
Rock music discographies